Patan Assembly constituency is one of the 230 Madhya Pradesh Legislative Assembly constituencies of Madhya Pradesh state in central India. It is a segment of the Jabalpur (Lok Sabha constituency) and is in Jabalpur district. After the last delimitation in 2007, the constituency comprises the Majholi and Patan tehsils of Jabalpur district.

Members of the Legislative Assembly

Election results

2018

See also
 List of constituencies of the Madhya Pradesh Legislative Assembly
 Jabalpur district

References

Assembly constituencies of Madhya Pradesh
Jabalpur district